Khurram Inam (born 28 October 1966, in Karachi) is a Pakistani skeet shooter. He represented the country for the third time at the 2012 Summer Olympics.

Olympic Games
Inam first participated at the 2000 Summer Olympics in Sydney, Australia where he placed 23T. At the 2004 Summer Olympics in Athens, Greece he placed 37T. He participated in his third Olympics in 2012 in London, UK, finishing in 28th.

References

Pakistani male sport shooters
Olympic shooters of Pakistan
1966 births
Living people
Shooters at the 2000 Summer Olympics
Shooters at the 2004 Summer Olympics
Shooters at the 2012 Summer Olympics
Shooters at the 1994 Asian Games
Shooters at the 2006 Asian Games
Shooters at the 2010 Asian Games
Shooters at the 2014 Asian Games
Asian Games competitors for Pakistan
Shooters at the 1998 Commonwealth Games
Shooters at the 2006 Commonwealth Games
21st-century Pakistani people